Lincoln, Pennsylvania is a borough in Allegheny County.

Lincoln, Pennsylvania could also refer to:

 Lincoln Township, Pennsylvania (disambiguation), various places
 Lincoln University, Pennsylvania

See also
 Lincoln Township (disambiguation), for the place names outside of Pennsylvania